Sonia Agarwal is an Indian actress known for her works predominantly in Tamil cinema and a few Telugu, Malayalam and Kannada films. She is best known for her performances in the films such as Kaadhal Kondein (2003), 7G Rainbow Colony (2004) and Pudhupettai  (2006), all of which are directed by her ex-husband, Selvaraghavan.

Featuring her former brother-in-law Dhanush, Kaadhal Kondein  became a huge success and she was widely appreciated for her performance as Divya in the film, which brought her into the limelight and fetched her the ITFA Best New Actress Award at  International Tamil Film Awards in 2004. She acted alongside Silambarasan and Vijay in the films Kovil and Madhurey, respectively. After appearing in the films Oru Kalluriyin Kathai and Oru Naal Oru Kanavu in 2005, both of which failing to perform at the box office, she got roles in the films Thiruttu Payale and Pudhupettai. The former was, directed by Susi Ganesan, became a highly successful film, whilst the latter, another Selvaraghavan film, received universal critical acclaim.

Personal life 
Born in Chandigarh, Sonia's mother tongue is Punjabi. Sonia married Selvaraghavan, a director in Tamil cinema, in December 2006. She gave up acting after her marriage. The couple divorced in 2010. She has since returned to performing.

Early career 
During her school days, Sonia got an offer to act in a serial on Zee TV. She then made her film debut with the 2002 Telugu film Nee Premakai, in which she did a small role, after which she acted in a Kannada film Chandu opposite Sudeep.

After getting divorced, she made a re-entry, playing a supporting role in the multi-starrer Vaanam, following which she signed up for four projects, three in Tamil and one in Malayalam, in quick succession. Her next releases were Sadhurangam, opposite Srikanth once again, in 2011 and Oru Nadigayin Vakku Moolam in early 2012. Her films include Poi Sollathedi and Achchamenndid not do well in box office. In 2018, she has signed four Malayalam films.

Filmography

Films

Television

References

External links 

 
 

Indian film actresses
Indian television actresses
Year of birth missing (living people)
Living people
Actresses in Tamil cinema
Actresses in Tamil television
Actresses in Kannada cinema
Actresses in Malayalam cinema
Actresses in Telugu cinema
Actresses from Chandigarh
21st-century Indian actresses